Agustín Isunza (1900–1978) was a Mexican film actor. He appeared in over two hundred films during his career.

Selected filmography
 In the Times of Don Porfirio (1940)
 The Unknown Policeman (1941)
 Jesusita in Chihuahua (1942)
 The Count of Monte Cristo (1942)
 Doña Bárbara (1943)
 I Am a Fugitive (1946)
 Rosalinda (1945)
 Symphony of Life (1946)
 Your Memory and Me (1953)
 Here Are the Aguilares! (1957)
 El Topo (1970)

References

Bibliography
 Rogelio Agrasánchez. Guillermo Calles: A Biography of the Actor and Mexican Cinema Pioneer. McFarland, 2010.

External links

1900 births
1978 deaths
Mexican male film actors
Male actors from Coahuila